The San Diego State Aztecs women's tennis team represents San Diego State University in women's collegiate tennis. The Aztecs compete in the Mountain West Conference (MW) in Division I of the National Collegiate Athletic Association (NCAA). The team is based at the on-campus Aztec Tennis Center, opened in 2005, which it shares with the Aztecs men's tennis team.

Postseason
Aztec women's tennis, as of 2020, has reached the NCAA Division I Women's Tennis Championship 22 times. The team has won three Mountain West Conference regular season titles as well as one Mountain West tournament title. Additionally, the team won three titles as a member of the Western Athletic Conference (all regular season, as the WAC has never sponsored a conference tournament championship in women's tennis).

See also 

 Aztec Hall of Fame

References

External links 

 

women's
Mountain West Conference women's tennis
College women's tennis teams in the United States